Oh for the Getting and Not Letting Go is the self-released second album by All Smiles. It was released on June 30, 2009.

Track listing
All songs written by Jim Fairchild.
 "Maps to the Homes of Former Foes" – 3:48
 "I Was Never the One" – 3:57
 "Foxes in the Furnace" – 5:03
 "The Brightest Beyond" – 6:09
 "The Ones I Want to Live" – 4:40
 "Our Final Roles As Birds" – 3:33
 "Words of Wisdom" – 4:30
 "All You Are is a Human Sir" – 4:44
 "Brother I Know My Way" – 4:05
 "It Never Saves Me" – 3:33

Credits
 Produced by Solon Bixler and Jim Fairchild.
 Recorded and mixed by Mike Cresswell.

2009 albums